EAS may refer to:

Aeronautics 
 EAS Europe Airlines, a defunct French airline
 EAS Airlines, a defunct Nigerian airline
 Equivalent airspeed
 Essential Air Service, a U.S. government program
 San Sebastián Airport, in Spain

Government 
 East Asia Summit, a regional diplomatic forum
 Emergency Alert System, of the United States government
 European External Action Service, the diplomatic service and foreign and defence ministry of the European Union
 Enterprise Estonia, abbreviated EAS in Estonian, Estonian national foundation that aims to develop Estonian economy

Science 
 5-epiaristolochene synthase
 Eastern Analytical Symposium, an American analytical chemistry organization 
 Electric acoustic stimulation
 Electrophilic aromatic substitution
 European Astronomical Society
 Extensive air shower, a cosmic ray shower
 Extended area service, in telecommunications
 External anal sphincter

Technology 
 EAS3, a software toolkit for storing and processing binary data
 Electronic Air Suspension, a type of vehicle suspension
 Electronic article surveillance
 Enterprise application software
 Exchange ActiveSync, a data synchronization protocol

Other uses 
 East Asian studies, an academic field
 EAS (album), a 2000 album by Japanese rock band Fanatic Crisis
 EAS (nutrition brand), an American sports nutrition company
 Early American Studies, an academic journal
 Early Admissions Scheme (Hong Kong), a defunct university entrance program
 Encyclopedia of American Studies
 End of Active Service, in the military
 Escola Alegria de Saber, a network of Brazilian international schools in Japan
 European Academy of Sociology, a fellowship of sociologists
 Hellenic Defence Systems, a Greek defense company
 East Side Access, an ongoing Metropolitan Transportation Authority expansion project